Portrait of Mrs Mary Graham or The Honourable Mrs Graham is a 1777 oil on canvas painting by the British artist Thomas Gainsborough, produced shortly after Mary's marriage to Thomas Graham, the future Lord Lynedoch on 26 December 1774. It was one of the first works to enter the collection of the Scottish National Gallery in Edinburgh after its bequest in 1859 by the heirs of Thomas Graham.

Description
One of Gainsborough's finest portraits, it has become an icon of the Scottish National Gallery.

It is one of three works the artist completed of Mary Graham. A more conventional half length portrait, The Hon. Mrs. Thomas Graham, also completed between 1775-77 is believed to be the painting that was initially commissioned. It is now part of the Widener collection in the National Gallery of Art in Washington, D.C.

History
The sitter was born Mary Cathcart on 1 March 1757. She was the daughter of Charles Cathcart, 9th Lord Cathcart, who had recently served as the British ambassador at the court of Catherine the Great.

At aged 16 Mary married Thomas Graham in a double wedding with her older sister Jane, who married John Murray, 4th Duke of Atholl.

It was Mary's looks that caused a stir when Gainsborough exhibited her full length portrait at the Royal Academy in London in 1777. It secured her reputation as an icon of contemporary beauty and helped her to quickly become a prominent figure in the fashionable society of Georgian London. She attracted many admirers from Robert Burns to Georgiana, Duchess of Devonshire who recalled ‘her goodness, her sense, her sweetness’.

Sadly, Mary soon fell ill with Tuberculosis. Throughout her illness, she was nursed attentively by her husband. They first moved to Brighton, and then as her health deteriorated further, via revolutionary Paris, to the Mediterranean, in search of warmer climates. They reached the sea, but she died on 26 June 1792, near Hyères, aged just 35.

Thomas Graham lived another 50 years, but never remarried. He was so grief-stricken, he could not bring himself to look upon his wife's portrait. It was placed into storage and almost forgotten about, until it was exhibited 65 years later in Manchester in 1857. Two years later it was bequeathed by his descendants to the recently opened Scottish National Gallery.

References

1777 paintings
Portraits by Thomas Gainsborough
Portraits of women
Paintings in the National Galleries of Scotland